Lietz is a German surname.

Notable people with this surname include:
 Arne Lietz (born 1976) is a German politician
 Georg Lietz, German canoer
 Hermann Lietz (1868-1919), German theologian
 Mattie Lietz (1893-1056), American painter
 Richard Lietz (born 1983), Austrian driver